Edmund is a census-designated place (CDP) in the Town of Linden in Iowa County, Wisconsin, United States.

Description
The CDP is located on U.S. Route 18 west of Dodgeville. The community's post office closed on November 2, 2002. As of the 2010 census, Edmund's population was 173.

History
Edmund got its name in 1881 from Edmund V. Baker who owned the land where the settlement was located.

See also
 List of census-designated places in Wisconsin

References

External links

Census-designated places in Iowa County, Wisconsin
Census-designated places in Wisconsin